IBP, Inc. v. Alvarez, 546 U.S. 21 (2005), is a US labor law case of the a United States Supreme Court, interpreting the Federal Labor Standards Act (FLSA) of 1938, as amended by the Portal-to-Portal Act of 1947.

Facts
Workers for the Iowa Beef Processors, Inc. (IBP, Inc.) (now Tyson Foods, Inc.) filed a class-action lawsuit for unpaid wage reparations. Workers were not being paid for time spent putting on and taking off protective gear, or walking to and from the changing area. IBP, Inc. argued that changing into protective gear did not constitute a “principal activity” of the job and thus was not compensable by law.

Judgment
The Supreme Court unanimously held that putting on protective gear and walking to and from changing areas are “integral and indispensable” to the job's “principal activities” and must be paid.

However, the court said that waiting time in a queue for protective gear was “two steps removed from principal activities” and is not compensable under FLSA regulations. Additionally, time spent waiting to put on protective gear before leaving at the end of the workday should be paid. Compensable work hours begin at the time the employer asks employees to arrive. If employees are forced to wait at the beginning of their shift because the employer does not yet have protective gear available, employees will be compensated for their waiting time.

Significance
This case overturned a previous ruling by the United States Court of Appeals, First Circuit, in Tum v Barber Foods, Inc in 2003. Forty-four employees filed a class-action suit against Barber Foods, Inc., identical to employees' complaints against IBP, Inc. Barber Foods successfully argued that time spent donning and doffing protective gear was minimal (2–4 minutes per day) and not included in productive work activity. Thus, Barber Foods was not required to compensate employees for time spent changing, waiting or walking between the changing room and the meatpacking floor.

References 

 “IBP v Alavarez.”Duke Law. September 2010. <https://web.archive.org/web/20110306023016/http://www.law.duke.edu/publiclaw/supremecourtonline/certGrants/2005/ibpvalv>
 Mize, Katherine and Laurence Stuart. “Supreme Court Rules: Time Spent Preparing to Work Starts the Time Clock.” Labor and Employment Matters. November 2005. September 2010. < http://www.leggefarrow.com/docs/111505_Newsletter_Supreme_Court_Rules_Time_Spent_Preparing_to_Work_Starts_the_Time_Clock.pdf>
 Pautler, Paul, Terry Potter, Virginia Fry and Nicole Theophilus. “Don and Doff the Day’s Apparel: IBP, Inc. v Alvarez.” Martindale.com. 7 December 2005. September 2010. < http://www.martindale.com/labor-employment-law/article_Husch-Blackwell-Sanders-LLP_201596.htm>

External links
 

United States Supreme Court cases
2005 in United States case law
United States Supreme Court cases of the Rehnquist Court
Tyson Foods
United States labor case law